Rozzol in Valle and Rozzol in Monte are neighborhoods in Trieste, Italy.

Other neighborhoods include: Servola, Scorcola, San Giusto, Campi Elisi, San Vito, Grignano, Chiadino, Guardiella, Roiano, Gretta, Barcola, Longera, Sottolongera, Chiarbola, Campanelle, Altura, Cacciatore, Monte Radio, Sottomonte, Bovedo, Cedas, Scala Santa, Borgo San Sergio, San Luigi, Cologna, Valmaura, Borgo Teresiano, Cattinara, Le Rive, San Giovanni, San Giacomo, and probably others.

References

Geography of Trieste